The Ahimanawa Range is a range of rugged hills in the northern Hawke's Bay region of the eastern North Island of New Zealand. It is located between Napier and Taupo.

Taupō District
Mountain ranges of New Zealand
Landforms of the Hawke's Bay Region